In cell biology, the Celada–Seiden model is a logical description at the inter-cellular level of the mechanisms making up the adaptive immune humoral and cellular response to a genetic antigen.

The computational counterpart of the Celada–Seiden model is the IMMSIM code.

Cell biology